Chicken ghee roast is a popular Tuluva Mangalorean Chicken recipe whose origins go back to the town, Kundapur, close to Udupi. Chicken ghee roast is fiery red in colour, and has a tangy and spicy flavor with ghee and roasted spices.

A few key ingredients of Chicken Ghee Roast are:

Chicken, Curds , Onions, Ghee, Jaggery, Tamarind, Ginger, Garlic and some regional Spices and Condiments.

References 

Indian chicken dishes
Indian curries
Mangalorean cuisine
Karnataka cuisine